Nico Klaß (born 3 April 1997) is a German footballer who plays as a centre-back for Rot-Weiß Oberhausen.

Career
Klaß made his professional debut for Eintracht Braunschweig in the 2. Bundesliga on 26 September 2020, coming on as an 81st-minute substitute for Suleiman Abdullahi in the 0–0 home draw against Holstein Kiel.

References

External links
 
 
 
 

1997 births
Living people
Footballers from Duisburg
German footballers
Association football central defenders
TV Jahn Hiesfeld players
Rot-Weiß Oberhausen players
Eintracht Braunschweig players
2. Bundesliga players
Regionalliga players